Saint-Martin-aux-Arbres is a commune in the Seine-Maritime department in the Normandy region in northern France.

Geography
The A29 autoroute forms most of the northern border of the commune.

Heraldry

Population

Places of interest
 The church of St. Martin, dating from the thirteenth century.

See also
Communes of the Seine-Maritime department

References

Communes of Seine-Maritime